In linguistics, and more precisely in traditional grammar, a cardinal numeral (or cardinal number word) is a part of speech used to count. Examples in English are the words one, two, three, and the compounds three hundred [and] forty-two and nine hundred [and] sixty. Cardinal numerals are classified as definite, and are related to ordinal numbers, such as the English first, second, third, etc.

See also 
 Arity
 Cardinal number for the related usage in mathematics
 English numerals (in particular the Cardinal numbers section)
 Distributive number
 Multiplier
 Numeral for examples of number systems
 Ordinal number
 Valency

References 
Notes

Numerals